The Mexico City Metrobús Line 4 is a bus rapid transit line in the Mexico City Metrobus. It operates between Colonia Buenavista, in central Mexico City and the Mexico City International Airport in the Venustiano Carranza borough, in the east of the capital.

Line 4 has a total of 40 stations and a length of 40.5 kilometers divided into two routes, called the North and South routes, and goes mainly through Mexico City's downtown towards and from Mexico City International Airport.

Construction of Line 4 started on July 4, 2011 and it was inaugurated on April 1, 2012 by Marcelo Ebrard, Head of Government of the Federal District from 2006 to 2012.

Service description

Services
The line has three itineraries and two routes: North and South.

Buenavista to Terminal 2 (North route)
To Terminal 2
First Bus: 4:30 (Monday-Friday)
Last Bus: 00:15 (Monday-Friday)
First Bus: 4:30 (Saturday)
Last Bus: 00:15 (Saturday)
First Bus: 4:30 (Sunday)
Last Bus: 00:15 (Sunday)

To Buenavista
First Bus: 4:30 (Monday-Friday)
Last Bus: 00:00 (Monday-Friday)
First Bus: 4:30 (Saturday)
Last Bus: 00:00 (Saturday)
First Bus: 4:30 (Sunday)
Last Bus: 00:00 (Sunday)

Buenavista to San Lázaro (South route)
To San Lázaro
First Bus: 4:30 (Monday-Friday)
Last Bus: 00:30 (Monday-Friday)
First Bus: 4:30 (Saturday)
Last Bus: 00:30 (Saturday)
First Bus: 5:00 (Sunday)
Last Bus: 00:36 (Sunday)

To Buenavista
First Bus: 4:28 (Monday-Friday)
Last Bus: 00:15 (Monday-Friday)
First Bus: 4:28 (Saturday)
Last Bus: 00:15 (Saturday)
First Bus: 5:00 (Sunday)
Last Bus: 00:30 (Sunday)

Buenavista to San Lázaro (North route)
To San Lázaro
First Bus: 4:30 (Monday-Friday)
Last Bus: 00:35 (Monday-Friday)
First Bus: 4:30 (Saturday)
Last Bus: 00:35 (Saturday)
First Bus: 5:00 (Sunday)
Last Bus: 00:36 (Sunday)

To Buenavista
First Bus: 4:27 (Monday-Friday)
Last Bus: 00:12 (Monday-Friday)
First Bus: 4:27 (Saturday)
Last Bus: 00:12 (Saturday)
First Bus: 5:00 (Sunday)
Last Bus: 00:30 (Sunday)

Pantitlán to Hidalgo
To Hidalgo
First Bus: 4:30 (Monday-Friday)
Last Bus: 22:59 (Monday-Friday)
First Bus: 4:30 (Saturday)
Last Bus: 22:59 (Saturday)
First Bus: 5:00 (Sunday)
Last Bus: 23:04 (Sunday)

To Pantitlán
First Bus: 5:04 (Monday-Friday)
Last Bus: 22:33 (Monday-Friday)
First Bus: 5:04 (Saturday)
Last Bus: 23:33 (Saturday)
First Bus: 5:30 (Sunday)
Last Bus: 23:35 (Sunday)

Alameda Oriente to Hidalgo
To Hidalgo
First Bus: 4:30 (Monday-Friday)
Last Bus: 22:59 (Monday-Friday)
First Bus: 4:30 (Saturday)
Last Bus: 22:59 (Saturday)
First Bus: 5:00 (Sunday)
Last Bus: 23:58 (Sunday)

To Alameda Oriente
First Bus: 5:20 (Monday-Friday)
Last Bus: 23:40 (Monday-Friday)
First Bus: 5:20 (Saturday)
Last Bus: 23:40 (Saturday)
First Bus: 5:51 (Sunday)
Last Bus: 23:49 (Sunday)

Line 4 services the Cuauhtémoc and Venustiano Carranza boroughs.

Station list

North route
{| width="80%"  class="wikitable"
! align="center" width="30%"| Stations
! align="center"|North
! align="center"|Alameda Oriente–Hidalgo
! Connections
! Neighborhood(s) 
! width="100px" | Borough(s)
! Picture
! Date opened
|-
|  Buenavista
| align="center"|●
| align="center"|
| 
  Line 1: Buenavista station
  Line 3: Buenavista station
 Buenavista
 (at distance)
  Line B: Buenavista station
 Line 1: Buenavista station
 Routes: 10-E, 11-C, 12-B
| rowspan=2| Buenavista
| rowspan=10| Cuauhtémoc
| 
| rowspan=17| April 1, 2012
|-
|  Delegación Cuauhtémoc
| align="center"|●
| align="center"|
|

| 
|-
|  México Tenochtitlan
| align="center"|●
| align="center"|
| 
 (at distance)
  Line 2: Revolución station
 Routes: 12-B (at distance), 16-A, 16-B
| rowspan=2| Buenavista, Tabacalera
| 
|-
|  Museo San Carlos
| align="center"|●
| align="center"|
|

| 
|-
|  Hidalgo
| align="center"|●
| align="center"|●
| 
  Line 3: Hidalgo station
  Line 7: Hidalgo station
 (at distance)
  Line 2: Hidalgo station
  Line 3: Hidalgo station
 Route: 27-A
 Line 5: Metro Hidalgo stop
 Route: 16-A
| rowspan=2| Guerrero, Centro
| 
|-
|  Bellas Artes
| align="center"|●
| align="center"|●
| 

  Line 2: Bellas Artes station
  Line 8: Bellas Artes station
 Line 1: Bellas Artes stop
 Route: 16-A
| 
|-
|  Teatro Blanquita
| align="center"|●
| align="center"|●
| 
 Line 1: República de Perú stop
| rowspan=5| Centro
| 
|-
|  República de Chile
| align="center"|●
| align="center"|●
|
| 
|-
|  República de Argentina
| align="center"|●
| align="center"|●
|
| 
|-
|  Mercado Abelardo L. Rodríguez
| align="center"|●
| align="center"|●
|
| 
|-
|  Mixcalco
| align="center"|●
| align="center"|●
|
| Cuauhtémoc / Venustiano Carranza
| 
|- 
|  Ferrocarril de Cintura
| align="center"|●
| align="center"|●
|
| Centro, Ampliación Penitenciaria
| rowspan=9| Venustiano Carranza
| 
|-
|  Morelos
| align="center"|●
| align="center"|●
|
  Line 4: Morelos station (at distance)
  Line B: Morelos station (at distance)
 Routes: 18 (at distance), 37
 Routes: 5-A, 10-E (at distance)
| Ampliación Penitenciaria, Morelos
| 
|-
|  Archivo General de la Nación
| align="center"|●
| align="center"|●
|
  Line 5: Archivo General de la Nación station
| Ampliación Penitenciaria, Penitenciaria
| 
|-
|  San Lázaro
| align="center"|●
| align="center"|
| 
  Line 5: San Lázaro station
 San Lázaro
  Line 1: San Lázaro station
  Line B: San Lázaro station
<li> East Bus Terminal (TAPO)
| 7 de Julio
| 
|-
|  Terminal 1
| align="center"|●
| align="center"|
| 
<li>  Mexico City Airport
<li>  Aerotren (at distance)
<li>  Line 5: Terminal Aérea station (at distance)
<li> Routes: 43, 200
<li> Line 4: Terminal Aérea stop (east–west route)
<li> Route: 20-B
| rowspan=2| Mexico City International Airport
| 
|-
|  Terminal 2
| align="center"|●
| align="center"|
|
<li>  Mexico City Airport
<li>  Aerotren
| 
|-
|  Pantitlán
| align="center"|
| align="center"|●
|
<li> Pantitlán
<li>  Line 1: Pantitlán station
<li>  Line 5: Pantitlán station
<li>  Line 9: Pantitlán station
<li>  Line A: Pantitlán station
<li>  Line III: Pantitlán station
<li> Route: 168
<li> Line 2: Pantitlán stop
<li> Routes: 11-B, 11-C, 19-F, 19-G
| Adolfo López Mateos, Aviación Civil, Pantitlán
| 
| 3 June 2021
|-
|  Calle 6
| align="center"|
| align="center"|●
|
<li>  Line III: Calle 6 station
| Cuchilla Pantitlán
| 
| rowspan=2 | 27 March 2022
|-
|   Alameda Oriente
| align="center"|
| align="center"|●
| 
<li> Route: 47-A
| Arsenal 4ta Sección
| 
|}

South route
Since the route has a complex route with several one-way stations, the following table will start at the Buenavista Terminal Station and follow an eastward flow until reaching the San Lázaro Terminal Station, then follow the route westward culminating with the 20 de Noviembre station.

Replacement of stations
On November 28, 2022, five eastward bus stops were removed. Mercado de Sonora, La Merced,  Mercado Ampudia,  Las Cruces Norte and Museo de la Ciudad stations were relocated southbound due to traffic jams caused by their location in the market area of the historic center of the city.

Operator
Conexión Centro-Aeropuerto, SA de CV (CCA) is the sole operator of Line 4.

Notes

References

2012 establishments in Mexico
4
Bus rapid transit in Mexico